Mohammad Bahawal Khan V (1883–1907), full title H.H. Rukn ud-Daula, Mukhlis ud-Daula, Hafiz ul-Mulk, Al-Haj Nawab Mohammad Bahawal Khan Abbasi V Bahadur, was the Nawab of the Kingdom of Bahawalpur, a former princely state of the British Raj, now part of Pakistan. He ruled from 1899 until his death. As Nawab of Bahawalpur he was entitled to a 17-gun salute.

Biography
Mohammad Bahawal Khan V was the second son by the second wife of Nawab Amir Sir Sadeq Mohammad Khan Abbasi IV Bahadur. In 1899, when he was only fifteen, Nawab Mohammad Bahawal Khan V ascended the throne of Bahawalpur following his father's death. He reigned under a Council of Superintendence until he came of age and was invested with full ruling powers in a ceremony attended by the Viceroy, Lord Curzon himself, at Derawar Fort on 12 November 1903.

In 1902 Nawab Mohammad Bahawal Khan V was invited to London to attend the Coronation of Edward VII and Queen Alexandra at Westminster Abbey. He set out from Karachi, but on the preliminary voyage to Bombay he suffered so severely from sea sickness that on landing there he cancelled the visit.

On 15 February 1907 Mohammad Bahawal Khan V died of illness on a ship while sailing off the coast of Aden. He was succeeded by his only male heir, Sadeq Mohammad Khan V, who was then only 3 years old.

References

External links

 

1883 births
1907 deaths
Nawabs of Bahawalpur (princely state)
Princely rulers of Pakistan
Nawabs of Pakistan